Chilton Foliat Meadows is a 54.6 hectare biological Site of Special Scientific Interest in the civil parish of Chilton Foliat in the English county of Wiltshire. It was notified in 1971 and is split across Berkshire and Wiltshire.

Sources
 Natural England citation sheet for the site (accessed 23 March 2022)

External links
 Natural England website (SSSI information)

Sites of Special Scientific Interest in Berkshire
Sites of Special Scientific Interest in Wiltshire
Sites of Special Scientific Interest notified in 1971
Meadows in Wiltshire